Rock Island Mysteries (originally announced as Taylor's Island) is an Australian comedy television show for children and young teenagers, which premiered on 10 Shake on 2 May 2022 and Nickelodeon on the following day. It follows the adventures of Taylor's group of friends, who explore Rock Island.

Production
The 20 part series was filmed on the Gold Coast and Port Douglas, Queensland in 2021 and is a FremantleMedia Australia production for Network 10 and Nickelodeon International.

The series was created by Matthew Cooke, Vincent Lund and Michael Ford. It was written by script producer Stephen Vagg, with writers Sam Carroll, Alix Beane, David Hannam, Marisa Nathar, Natesha Somasundaram, Trent Roberts, Jessica Brookman and Hannah Samuel.

In October 2022, Network 10 and Nickelodeon announced the show had been renewed for a second season, which is set to premiere in 2023.

Cast
 Alexa Curtis as Taylor Young
 Noah Akhigbe as Nori Harlow
 Inessa Tan as Meesha Rai
 Ryan Yeates as Ellis Grouch
 Izellah Connelly as Lila Gray, Taylor's step-sister
 Kimberley Joseph as Emily Young, Taylor's mother
 Craig Horner as Sunny Gray, Taylor's step-father
 Monette Lee as Gillian Rai
 Annabelle Stephenson as Racquel Newman
 Lucas Linehan as Uncle Charlie

Episodes

References

External links

2022 Australian television series debuts
2020s Australian comedy television series
2020s Australian drama television series
Australian children's mystery television series
2020s teen drama television series
2020s mystery television series
Australian drama television series
Nickelodeon original programming
English-language television shows
10 Shake original programming
Television series about teenagers
Television shows filmed in Australia
Television series by Fremantle (company)